Municipal elections were held across Somaliland on 15 December 2002. Six political associations fielded 2,368 candidates to contest 379 local council seats in nineteen of Somaliland's twenty-three electoral districts.

Prior to these elections, local government only consisted of a mayor and a councillor both appointed by the Ministry of Interior by the recommendation of the President.  These elections would pave way for the establishment of popularly-elected local governments that were directly responsible to local constituencies.

Political associations 
The Constitution of Somaliland stipulated that only three political parties could exist at any one time. As a result, the three associations that gained the largest numbers of local council seats would become the official political parties and enjoyed exclusive legitimacy for the next ten years .A political organisation had to achieve 20% of the vote in at least four of Somaliland's six regions in order to become a national party and contest presidential and parliamentary elections. 

The contenders that took part in this process included: 

 Peace, Unity, and Development Party (Kulmiye) headed by Ahmed Mohamed Mohamoud
 United Peoples' Democratic Party (UDUB) led by President Muhammad Haji Ibrahim Egal
 For Justice and Development (UCID) led by Faysal Ali Warabe
 Sahan led by Dr Mohamed Abdi Gaboose
 Asad led by Suleiman Mohamoud Adan
 Hormood led by Umar Ghalib

Results
Over 440,000 people took part in the country's first municipal elections. Results were announced a week later by the National Electoral Commission, with UDUB, Kulmiye and UCID finishing as the top three parties.

Aftermath
The elections were viewed largely as a success and was an essential step in the transition from a clan-based formed of governance to a democracy.

Political associations that ranked fourth or lower ceased to exist. Although Sahan passed the threshold of receiving 20% of the votes in at least four regions and UCID did not, it was decided that UCID's higher national vote share qualified it to become the third party, a controversial decision. 

Councillors from the associations that were dissolved were subsequently required to join one of the newly appointed national parties, UDUB, Kulmiye or UCID.

References

2002 elections in Africa
2002 in Somaliland
Elections in Somaliland
December 2002 events in Africa